Grey Valley is a former parliamentary electorate in the West Coast region of New Zealand.

Population centres
The 1870 electoral redistribution was undertaken by a parliamentary select committee based on population data from the 1867 New Zealand census. Eight sub-committees were formed, with two members each making decisions for their own province; thus members set their own electorate boundaries. The number of electorates was increased from 61 to 72, and Grey Valley was one of the new electorates.

The Taramakau River formed the southern boundary of the electorate, from the mouth all the way to Harper's Pass (a historic alpine crossing). The boundary then followed the Main Divide to just short of Lewis Pass. From there, it stayed at some distance south from the Maruia River, then went for a long distance in a straight line towards the coast to then turn sharply south at the Paparoa Range before hitting the coast just south of Punakaiki. The main population centres in this configuration were Greymouth and the coal mining towns in the Brunner Borough (which itself was not constituted until 1887).

In the 1875 electoral redistribution, the electorate was extended towards the north into an area previously belonging to the  electorate by following the Maruia River for a distance to the west, with the boundary then nearing the coast on a line between Reefton and Inangahua, then followed the Paparoa Range towards the south before hitting the coast just south of Punakaiki. The main population centre gained by this boundary adjustment was Reefton.

History
Grey Valley existed from 1871 to 1881. William Henry Harrison was the first representative from 1871 to 1875 when he retired. Harrison had previously represented Westland Boroughs from 1868 to 1870.

The electorate was represented by two members from the 1876 election onwards. Martin Kennedy and Charles Woolcock were elected in 1876; Kennedy resigned in 1878 and Woolcock retired at the 1879 election. Kennedy was succeeded by Richard Reeves in an 1878 by-election. He was defeated in 1881 when he stood for Inangahua. Edward Masters succeeded Woolcock in the 1879 election. Masters resigned in 1881 and was succeeded by Thomas S. Weston in an 1881 by-election. Weston stood in Inangahua in the 1881 general election and was successful.

Members of Parliament
The Grey Valley electorate was represented by six members of parliament.

Key

1871 to 1875
From 1871 to 1875, Grey Valley was a single-member electorate. It was represented by one Member of Parliament.

1876 to 1881
From 1876 to 1881, Grey Valley was a two-member electorate. It was represented by five Members of Parliament.

Election results

1881 by-election

1878 by-election

1876 election

 
 
 
 
 
 

Table footnotes:

Notes

References

Historical electorates of New Zealand
Grey District
Politics of the West Coast, New Zealand
1870 establishments in New Zealand
1881 disestablishments in New Zealand